Susan Howe (born June 10, 1937) is an American poet, scholar, essayist, and critic, who has been closely associated with the Language poets, among other poetry movements. Her work is often classified as Postmodern because it expands traditional notions of genre (fiction, essay, prose and poetry). Many of Howe's books are layered with historical, mythical, and other references, often presented in an unorthodox format. Her work contains lyrical echoes of sound, and yet is not pinned down by a consistent metrical pattern or a conventional poetic rhyme scheme.

Howe is the recipient of the 2017 Robert Frost Medal awarded by the Poetry Society of America, the recipient of the 2011 Bollingen Prize in American Poetry, and a member of the American Academy of Arts and Sciences.

Personal life
Howe was born on June 10, 1937 in Boston, Massachusetts. She grew up in nearby Cambridge. Her mother, Mary Manning, was an Irish playwright and acted for Dublin's Gate Theatre. Her father Mark DeWolfe Howe, was a professor at Harvard Law School and was the official biographer of Supreme Court Justice Oliver Wendell Holmes. Her aunt was Helen Howe, a monologuist and novelist. She has two sisters, Helen Howe Braider and poet Fanny Howe. Howe graduated from the Boston Museum School of Fine Arts in 1961. She married the painter, Harvey Quaytman in 1961. She was married to her second husband, sculptor David von Schlegell, until his death (1992). Her third husband, Peter Hewitt Hare, a philosopher and professor at the University of Buffalo, died in January 2008. She has two children, the painter R.H. Quaytman, and the writer Mark von Schlegell. She lives in Guilford, Connecticut.

Publications
Howe is an author of a number of books of poetry, including Europe of Trusts: Selected Poems (1990), Frame Structures: Early Poems 1974-1979 (1996) and The Midnight (2003), Pierce-Arrow (1999), Bed Hangings with Susan Bee (2001),Souls of the Labadie Track, (2007) Frolic Architecture, (2010), "Spontaneous Particulars: The Telepathy of Archives" (2014) and That This (2010), and three books of criticism, The Birth-Mark: Unsettling the Wilderness in American Literary History (1993), "The Gorgeous Nothings: Emily Dickinson's Envelope Poems" (2013) and My Emily Dickinson (1985). Howe began publishing poetry with Hinge Picture in 1974 and was initially received as a part of the amorphous grouping of experimental writers known as the language poets-writers such as Charles Bernstein, Bruce Andrews, Lyn Hejinian, Carla Harryman, Barrett Watten, and Ron Silliman. Her work has appeared in numerous anthologies, including The Norton Anthology of Modern and Contemporary Poetry, the L=A=N=G=U=A=G=E poetry anthology In the American Tree, and The Norton Anthology of Postmodern Poetry.

In 2003, Howe started collaborating with experimental musician David Grubbs. The results were released on five CD's: Thiefth (featuring the poems Thorow and Melville's Marginalia), Songs of the Labadie Tract,  Frolic Architecture, Woodslippercounterclatter, and Concordance.

Other activities
After graduating from high school, Howe spent a year in Dublin as an apprentice at the Gate Theatre.  After graduating from the Boston Museum School in 1961, she moved to New York, where she painted. In 1988 she had her first visiting professorship in English at the University at Buffalo, The State University of New York, becoming a full professor and core faculty of the Poetics Program in 1991, later being appointed Capen Chair and Distinguished Professor. She retired in 2006. Recently, Howe has held the following positions: Distinguished Fellow, Stanford Institute of the Humanities; faculty, Princeton University, University of Chicago, University of Utah, and Wesleyan University (English Department’s Distinguished Visiting Writer, 2010–11).

Awards
Susan Howe was awarded with the American Book Awards organized by the Before Columbus Foundation in both 1981 and 1986. "She was elected a member of the American Academy of Arts and Sciences in 1999 and a Chancellor of The Academy of American Poets in 2000." She was the fall 2009 Anna-Maria Kellen Fellow at the American Academy in Berlin. In 2009, she was awarded a Berlin Prize fellowship. In 2011, Howe was awarded the Yale Bollingen Prize in American Poetry.

Bibliography

 Hinge Picture (1974)
 Chanting at the Crystal Sea (1975)
 The Western Borders (1976)
 Thorn, thistle, apron leaf (1976)
 Secret History of the Dividing Line (1978)
 Cabbage Gardens (1979)
 The Liberties (1980)
 Pythagorean Silence (1982)
 Defenestration of Prague (1983)
 "The Liberties"
 My Emily Dickinson (1985; reissued 2007)
 Incloser (1985)
 Heliopathy (1986)
 Articulation of Sound Forms in Time (1987)
 A Bibliography of the King's Book, or Eikon Basilike' (1989)
 The Europe of Trusts (1990)
 "Pythagorean Silence"
 "Defenestration of Prague"
 "The Liberties"
 Singularities (1990)
 "Articulation of Sound Forms in Time"
 "Thorow"
 "Scattering as Behavior Towards Risk"
 Silence Wager Stories (1992)
 The Nonconformist’s Memorial (1993)
 "The Nonconformist’s Memorial"
 "Silence Wager Stories"
 "A Bibliography of the King’s Book, or Eikon Basilike"
 "Melville’s Marginalia"	
 The Birth-mark: Unsettling the Wilderness in American Literary History (1993)
 "Submarginalia"
 "Incloser"
 "Quasi-marginalia"
 "The Captivity and Restoration of Mrs. Mary Rowlandson"
 "These Flames and Generosities of the Heart"
 "Talisman interview with Edward Foster"
 Interview with Lynn Keller (1995)
 Frame Structures (1996)
 "Hinge Picture"
 "Chanting at the Crystal Sea"
 "Cabbage Gardens"
 "Secret History of the Dividing Line"
 Pierce-Arrow (1999)
 Deux Et (1998)
 Bed Hangings I (2001)
 Bed Hangings II (2002)
 Kidnapped (2002)
 The Midnight (2003)
 "Bed Hangings I + II"
 "Scare Quotes I + II"
 "Kidnapped"
 Souls of the Labadie Tract (2007)
 My Emily Dickinson (2007 reissue of 1985 publication)
 THAT THIS (2010) (includes six black and white photograms by James Welling)
 Sorting Facts, or Nineteen Ways of Looking at Marker (New Directions Poetry Pamphlets) (2013) 
 Tom Tit Tot (2013)
 Spontaneous Particulars: The Telepathy of Archives (2014)
 The Quarry: Essays (2015)
 Debths (2017) (winner of the 2018 Griffin Poetry Prize)

Exhibitions
 Tom Tit Tot, Yale Union, 2013.

Some critical works on Howe's writing
 Back, Rachel Tzvia. Led By Language: The Poetry and Poetics of Susan Howe. Tuscaloosa, AL: University of Alabama Press, 2002.
 Collis, Stephen. Through Words of Others: Susan Howe and Anarcho-Scholasticism. Victoria, BC: English Literary Studies Editions, 2006.
 Crown, Kathleen. "Documentary Memory and Textual Agency: H.D. and Susan Howe." How2, v. 1, n° 3, Feb. 2000.
 Daly, Lew. Swallowing the Scroll: Late in a Prophetic Tradition with the Poetry of Susan Howe and John Taggart. Buffalo, NY: M Press, 1999.
 Davidson, Michael. "Palimptexts: Postmodern Poetry and the Material Text", Postmodern Genres. Marjorie Perloff, ed. Norman, OK: University of Oklahoma Press, 1988/89. (Coll.: n° 5 of Oklahoma Project for Discourse and Theory.) pp. 75–95.
 "The Difficulties Interview", issue dedicated to Susan Howe. The Difficulties, 3.2, 1989. pp. 17–27.
 Duplessis, Rachel Blau. "Our law /vocables /of shape or sound : The work of Susan Howe", How(ever) v.1 n° 4, May 1984.
 Foster, Ed. "An Interview with Susan Howe", Talisman: A Journal of Contemporary Poetry and Poetics, n° 4: special issue on Susan Howe, 1990. pp. 14–38.
 Howard, W. Scott. "Literal/Littoral Crossings: Re-Articulating Hope Atherton’s Story After Susan Howe’s Articulation of Sound Forms in Time." Water: Resources and Discourses. Ed. Justin Scott Coe and W. Scott Howard. Reconstruction: Studies in Contemporary Culture 6.3 (2006): .
 Howard, W. Scott. “Teaching, How/e?: not per se.” Denver Quarterly 35.2 (2000): 81-93.
 Howard, W. Scott. “‘writing ghost writing’: A Discursive Poetics of History; or, Howe's hau in ‘a bibliography of the king’s book; or, eikon basilike’.” Talisman 14 (1995): 108-30.
 Joyce, Elisabeth. "The Small Space of a Pause": Susan Howe's Poetry and the Spaces Between. Lewisburg, PA: Bucknell University Press, 2010.
 Keller, Lynn. Forms of Expansion: Recent Long Poems by Women. Chicago, IL: University of Chicago Press, 1997.
 Ma, Ming-Qian. "Articulating the Inarticulate: Singularities and the Countermethod in Susan Howe,"  Contemporary Literature v.36 n° 3, 1995, pp. 466–489.
 Montgomery, Will. The Poetry of Susan Howe: History, Theology, Authority. New York, NY: Palgrave, 2010.
 Naylor, Paul. Poetic Investigations: Singing the Holes In History. Evanston, IL: Northwestern University Press, 1999.
 Nicholls, Peter. "Unsettling the Wilderness: Susan Howe and American History", Contemporary Literature, v.37, n° 4, 1996, pp. 586–601.
 Perloff, Marjorie. "Against Transparency : From the Radiant Cluster to the Word as Such" & "How it Means: Making Poetic Sense in Media Society"  in Radical Artifice, Chicago: University of Chicago Press, 1998.
 Perloff, Marjorie. "Language Poetry and the Lyric Subject: Ron Silliman's Albany, Susan Howe's Buffalo", Critical Inquiry, n° 25, Spring 1999, pp 405–434.
 Perloff, Marjorie. Poetic License: Essays on Modernist and Postmodernist Lyric. Evanston, IL: Northwestern University Press, 1990.
 Quartermain, Peter. Disjunctive Poetics: From Gertrude Stein and Louis Zukovsky to Susan Howe. Cambridge: Cambridge University Press, 1992.
 Rankine, Claudia, and Spahr, Juliana. American Women Poets in the 21st Century: Where Lyric Meets Language. Middletown, CT: Wesleyan University Press, 2002.
 Reinfeld, Linda M. Language Poetry: Writing as Rescue. Baton Rouge, LA: Louisiana State University Press, 1992.
 Swensen, Cole. "Against the Limits of Language: The Geometries of Anne-Marie Albiach and Susan Howe", in Moving Borders: Three Decades of Innovative Writing By Women, Mary Margaret Sloan, ed. Jersey City, NJ: Talisman House Publishers, 1998. pp. 630–641
 Ziarek, Krzysztof. The Historicity of Experience: Modernity, the Avant-Garde, and the Event. Evanston, IL: Northwestern University Press, 2001.

 References 

External links
 Susan Howe Homepage @ the EPC
 Susan Howe Papers MSS 0201. Special Collections & Archives, UC San Diego Library.
 Susan Howe audio at PennSound
 Susan Howe Page @ Modern American Poetry
 Susan Howe at the Poetry Foundation
 Jon THOMPSON's “Interview with Susan Howe” from Free Verse: A journal of contemporary poetry and poetics, 2005. at: 
 A review of Susan Howe's collaboration with David Grubbs by Ben Lerner
 Susan SCHULTZ's « Exaggerated History. » Postmodern Culture. v. 4, n° 2, Jan. 1994. online at: [www.english.upenn.edu]
 Cole SWENSEN's « To Writewithize (as in "to hybridize" to "harmonize" to "ionize" etc.)» American Letters & Commentary, Winter 2001. at: 
 Cole SWENSEN's  « Seeing reading: Susan Howe's Moving Margins. » Conference: Louisville Conference on Modern Literature. April 1999. at: 
 Brian MCHALE's « HER William Shakespeare: On the interventionist poetics of Susan Howe (in the male literary cannon) » Conference on contemporary poetry: Poetry and the Public Sphere. Rutger's University, April 24–27, 1997. at: 
 METCALF Paul. "Untitled: on Hope Atherton's Wandernings." on Modern American Poetry Website: 
 Bruce Campbell and Susan Howe, On Susan Howe and History, Modern American Poetry
 INTERVIEW in FRENCH with Omar BERRADA. « the space between: Poésie, cinéma, histoire. Entretien avec Susan Howe. » publié dans Vacarme'', n° 32, été 2005. Disponible sur : 
 Susan Howe Papers. Yale Collection of American Literature, Beinecke Rare Book and Manuscript Library.

1937 births
20th-century American essayists
20th-century American non-fiction writers
20th-century American painters
20th-century American poets
20th-century American women artists
20th-century American women writers
21st-century American essayists
21st-century American non-fiction writers
21st-century American painters
21st-century American poets
21st-century American women artists
21st-century American women writers
American Book Award winners
American contemporary painters
American satirists
American social commentators
American women academics
American women essayists
American women non-fiction writers
American women painters
American women poets
Berlin Prize recipients
Bollingen Prize recipients
Epic poets
Language poets
Literacy and society theorists
Living people
Mass media theorists
Modernist women writers
Painters from Massachusetts
Poets from Massachusetts
Postmodern writers
Princeton University faculty
School of the Museum of Fine Arts at Tufts alumni
Surrealist writers
University at Buffalo alumni
University at Buffalo faculty
University of Chicago faculty
University of Utah faculty
Wesleyan University faculty
Writers about activism and social change
Writers from Boston
Writers from Cambridge, Massachusetts